Trichomyrmex emeryi is a species of ant in the subfamily Myrmicinae.

Subspecies
 Monomorium emeryi emeryi Mayr, 1895 - Botswana, Malawi, Mozambique, Zimbabwe
 Monomorium emeryi laevior Mayr, 1897 - Sri Lanka

References

External links

 at antwiki.org
Animaldiversity.org

Myrmicinae
Hymenoptera of Asia
Insects described in 1895